The 1st Parachute Hussar Regiment is an airborne cavalry unit in the French Army, founded in 1720 by Hungarian noble Ladislas Ignace de Bercheny. It is stationed in Tarbes and is a part of the 11th Parachute Brigade.

Creation and different nominations 

 1719 - 1720 : The Hussars of Bercheny are raised at Constantinople, following the demand of the Regent Philippe I, Duke of Orléans by Count of Bercheny.
 1791 : Units of the French Army are named after their function of arms and numbered in terms of their seniority. The Regiment of Bercheny becomes accordingly the 1st Hussar Regiment.
 29 floréal an IV ( 29 - floréal: meaning the second month of spring - an IV or year IV : end of 1795 and debut of 1796 in the Gregorian calendar) : The regiment received half of the cavalry of the 13th Hussar Regiment.
 1815 : The regiment is dissolved.
 1816 : Creation of the 1st Hussar Regiment of Jura.
 1824 : Redesignated as 1st Hussar Regiment of Chartres.
 1940 : dissolved following the Armistice with Germany.
 1945 : recreated by the political resistance during World War II and designated Reconnaissance Regiment of the 25th Division.
 1946 : designated as 1st Parachute Hussar Regiment at the corps of the 25th Airborne Division 25e D.A.P on the occasion of the regiment's voyage to Algeria.

History since 1946

Campaigns

Composition 
The 1er RHP consists of:
 Command and Logistics Squadron (ECL)
 1st Squadron, Air-transportable armored (1er Escadron)
 6 VBL
 3 AMX 10 RC
 6 VAB C20
 2nd Squadron, Air-transportable armored (2e Escadron)
 13 VBL
 12 ERC 90 Sagaie
 3rd Squadron, Reconnaissance and Anti-Tank (ERIAC) (only unit fully parachutable, both men and equipment) (3e Escadron)
 VBL
 VBL reconnaissance, 7.62 mm AA-52 machine gun
 VBL anti-tank, MILAN anti-tank missile
 VBL support, 12.7 mm M2 Browning machine gun
 VBL command
 4th Squadron, Air-transportable armored (4e Escadron)
 13 VBL
 12 ERC 90 Sagaie
 5th Squadron, operational reserve (5e Escadron)
 11th Squadron, training and education (disbanded on 14 January 2011)
 2 GCP Teams

Equipment

Vehicles 

 AMX 10 RC (3)
 ERC 90 Sagaie (36)
 Véhicule Blindé Léger (68)
 Peugeot P4 (84)
 Cagiva motorcycles
 Véhicule de l'Avant Blindé

Weapons 
 MILAN anti-tank guided missile (24)

Traditions 

Except for the Legionnaires of the 1er REG, 2ème REG, 2ème REP that conserve the Green Beret; the remainder of the French army metropolitan and marine paratroopers forming the 11th Parachute Brigade wear the Red Beret.

The Archangel Saint Michael, patron of the French paratroopers is celebrated on September 29.

The prière du Para (Prayer of the Paratrooper) was written by André Zirnheld in 1938.

Insignias 
Just like the paratrooper Brevet of the French Army; the Insignia of French Paratroopers was created in 1946. The French Army Insignia of metropolitan Paratroopers represents a closed "winged armed dextrochere", meaning a "right winged arm" armed with a sword pointing upwards. The Insignia makes reference to the Patron of Paratroopers. In fact, the Insignia represents "the right Arm of Saint Michael", the Archangel which according to Liturgy is the "Armed Arm of God". This Insignia is the symbol of righteous combat and fidelity to superior missions.

Regimental Colors

Regimental Song 
Based on the melody of the revolutionary Polish song Whirlwinds of Danger :
Original version

Decorations

Honours

Battle honours 
 Valmy 1792
 Jemmapes 1792
 Castiglione 1796
 Eylau 1807
 Sebastopol 1855
 La Mortagne 1914
 La Serre 1918
 AFN 1952-1962

Regimental Commanders of the 1st Hussars Regiment

Ancien Régime 

 1720 : de Bercheny
 1722 : de Bonnaire
 1744 : de Nordmann
 1749 : de Totte
 1751 : de Bercheny (2), fils du précédent.
 1762 : de Polleretsky
 1762 : de Bercheny François Antoine Ladislas (1744-1811), son of the former.
 1762 : de Sombreuil
 1771 : de Humbert
 1776 : de Thumery
 1785 : de Pange
 1789 : Henri Roland Lancelot Turpin de Crissé

French Revolution and First French Empire 
 1792 : Henri Christian Michel Stengel-Colonel (**)
 1792 : Joseph Armand Nordman-Colonel
 1793 : Philippe Glad-Chef de brigade
 1795 : Louis Jean Charles Bougon-Duclos-Chef de brigade
 1796 : Antoine Henri de Carowe-Chef de brigade
 1797 : Joseph-Denis Picard-Chef de brigade (*)
 1803 : Philippe Augustin Rouvillois-Colonel
 1807 : Jacques Begougne de Juniac-Colonel
 1810 : Eugène Antoine François Merlin-Colonel (*)
 1813 : François Joseph Marie Clary-Colonel
 1814 : Nicolas Oudinot-Colonel
 1815 : François Joseph Marie Clary-Colonel

 Colonels wounded and killed while commanding the 1st Hussars during that period
 colonel Stengel, wounded April 21, 1796 during the battle of Mondovi, died from his wounds on April 28.
 chef de brigade Bouglon-Duclos, died of fever.
 chef de brigade Carrowe killed during the battle of Rovero on September 6, 1796.
 colonel Rouvillois, wounded on December 19, 1806.
 colonel Juniac, wounded on February 6, 1807.

 Officers killed and wounded while serving in the 1st Hussars Regiment between (1805 and 1815)
 Officers killed : 5
 Officers dying from wounds : 6
 Officers wounded : 57

First Restoration et Second Restoration 

 État-major du régiment nearing 1815
 colonel Auguste-Ambroise-Joselin de Verdière
 lieutenant-colonel : Armand-Louis, chavalier de l'Orme
 chefs d'escadrons : M. Vidal de Léry et Jacques-Victor de Suzainnecourt
 major : Joseph-Antoine, vicomte de Lodin du Mauvoic
 capitaines adjoint-majors : Pierre de Vigneras et Alexandre Pothée
 lieutenant-trésorier : François Vial
 capitaine d'habillement : Jean-Pierre Carmignac
 sous-lieutenant porte-étendard : Michel-Rémi Renaud
 aumônier : Jean Didier
 chirurgien major : Jean-Baptiste Hermaut
 chirurgien aide-major : Antoine-Claude Marchal, dit Lafontaine
 1824–1830
 colonel : Ferdinand-Philippe d'Orléans, duc de Chartres, futur duc d'Orléans

1830-1848 : July Monarchy 
 1830–1832 :
 colonel Royal Prince of France, duc d'Orléans
 cieutenant-colonel Lanthonnet
 chef d'escadron de Suremain
 chef d'escadron Lestocquoy
 1832–1836 : colonel Joseph Simon Pozac
 1845 : colonel Berryer

Second Empire 
 1854 : colonel comte Lion
 1856 : colonel Moucheton de Gerbrois
 1864 : colonel de la Jaille
 1867 : colonel prince de Bauffremont

1870-1914 

 1870 : colonel prince de Bauffremont
 1872 : colonel d'Agoult
 1884 : colonel Poulard
 1889 : colonel Buffet
 1892 : colonel Geslin de Bourgogne
 1894 : colonel Lageon
 1897 : colonel de Quinemont
 1907 : colonel Simon de la Mortière
 1912 : colonel Renaudeau d'Arc

World War I 
 1914 : colonel Leps
 1914–1918 : colonel d'Amade

Interwar Period 
 1926 : colonel Robert
 1931 : colonel Aubry de la Noé
 1932 : colonel Malcor

World War II 
 1939 : colonel Rabany
 1940 : colonel de Groulard (wounded in 1940, died from injuries sustained in 1947)

From 1945 till present 

 1946–19xx : colonel De Gastines
 1952–1953: colonel Teyssou
 1954–1956 : colonel Bertrand de Quénetain**
 1956–1958 : lieutenant-colonel Hebrard
 1958–1960 : lieutenant-colonel Jean Compagnon
 1960–1962 : colonel Gautier
 1962–1963 : lieutenant-colonel Teule
 1963–1964 : colonel Donnart
 1964–1966 : colonel de Boifleury**
 1966–1968 : colonel Laflaquiere
 1968–1970 : colonel Jean Combette***
 1970–1972 : colonel Boissau
 1972–1974 : colonel Delmotte**
 1974–1976 : colonel Morel
 1976–1978 : colonel Gouttenoire***
 1978–1980 : colonel Berge
 1980–1982 : colonel Varret
 1982–1984 : colonel Genest
 1984–1986 : colonel Gobillard****
 1986–1988 : colonel d'Astorg
 1988–1990 : colonel Le Mière***
 1990–1992 : colonel Valentin****
 1992–1994 : colonel Hubin
 1994–1996 : colonel Duhesme
 1996–1998 : colonel Maes*
 1998–2000 : colonel Duquesne***
 2000–2002 : colonel de Bavinchove*** ( CEM ISAF in Afghanistan )
 2002–2004 : colonel Delort-Laval** ( Director of the War School since August 2011 )** division since 2012
 2004–2006 : colonel de Marisy
 2006–2008 : colonel de Lapresle*
 2008–2010 : colonel Villiaumey
 2010–2012 : colonel Langlade de Montgros
 2012–2014 : colonel Peltier
 2014-.... : colonel Aumonier

(*) Officers which subsequently were promoted to Brigade generals.
(**) Officers which subsequently were promoted to Divisional generals
(***)Officers which subsequently were promoted to Corps generals
(****)Officers which subsequently were promoted to Army Generals.

Notable Hussars 
 Ferdinand-Philippe d'Orléans, duc de Chartres then duc d'Orléans, Dauphin de France
 César de Vachon de Belmont-Briançon then captain
 Général Jean-Antoine Marbot
 Général Baron Marcellin Marbot
 Général comte Frédéric Henri Walther (from the rank of a regular soldier -private- to the officer rank of captain)
 Général Nicolas-François Christophe (captain in 1793)
 Louis Bro (1781-1844), soldier, then futur cavalry general
 Colonel Nicolas Oudinot, son of Empire Marshal Nicolas-Charles Oudinot
 Maurice Dupin de Francueil, first capitain on December 21, 1805, then chef d'escadron on March 21, 1807
 Général Regnaud de Saint-Jean d'Angély (in 1815, to the rank of captain)
 Charles-Marie-Augustin, comte de Goyon (1803-1870), division general, major at 1er hussards le on January 15, 1839
 Charles Louis Schulmeister
 Charles Théodore Ernest de Hédouville (1809-1890), French politician, served in the regiment after 1829.
 Olivier de Germay
 Gaston de Galliffet
 Lieutenant Robert Chezeau

Gallery

See also 
 Hussar

References

External links 
 French official website of the Bercheny's - 1st Parachute Hussars Regiment 

Parachute regiments of France
Cavalry regiments of France
Regiments of the First French Empire
Regiments of the French First Republic
20th-century regiments of France
21st-century regiments of France
Hussars
Military units and formations established in 1720
Military units and formations disestablished in 1815
Military units and formations established in 1816
Military units and formations disestablished in 1828
Military units and formations established in 1928
Military units and formations disestablished in 1940
Military units and formations established in 1945